Jennifer Dunning (born February 4, 1942) is a writer and critic for The New York Times on the subjects of dance and ballet. She is the author of the 1985 But First a School: The First Fifty Years of the School of American Ballet, the 1996 Alvin Ailey, a Life in Dance, and the 1997 Great Performances: A Celebration.

Dunning was born in New York City and studied dance. In 1977 she became the ballet critic for The New York Times. She retired from the paper in 2008.

References

 

1942 births
Living people
American dance critics
Critics employed by The New York Times
Bessie Award winners
American women journalists
American women critics
21st-century American women